Discovery Elementary School may refer to:

Canada

United States

See also
 Discovery (disambiguation)
 Discovery Academy (disambiguation)
 Discovery School (disambiguation)